Nikolai Mikhailovich Shvernik (– 24 December 1970) was a Soviet politician who served as the Chairman of the Presidium of the Supreme Soviet from 19 March 1946 until 15 March 1953. Though the titular Soviet head of state, Shvernik had less power than Joseph Stalin as Chairman of the Council of Ministers of the Soviet Union.

Biography
Shvernik was born in 1888 in St. Petersburg in a working-class family of Russian ethnicity. His father was a retired sergeant major, who worked in factories in St Petersburg. Reputedly, he was descended from Old Believers.  Shvernik's mother was a weaver. He worked in factories as a turner, and joined the Bolsheviks in 1905. After the February Revolution in 1917, he was elected chairman of the soviet in a pipe factory in Samara, and chairman of the Samara city soviet. During the Russian Civil War, he was a political commissar in the Red Army. In 1921-23, he worked in the trade unions. 

In 1923, he was appointed to the staff of Rabkrin, which was headed by Joseph Stalin, whom Shvernik loyally supported during the power struggles of the 1920s. During 1923, he was in charge of combatting the sale of moonshine vodka and cocaine, and gambling. In November 1925, at the height of the conflict between Stalin and Grigory Zinoviev, he was appointed by the Central Committee to take over as Secretary of the Leningrad provincial committee, which was Zinoviev power base. 

Shvernik was a full member of the Central Committee from December 1925 until he died 45 years later. In April 1926, he was appointed to the Secretariat, one of a team of four secretaries led by Stalin, in place of Grigory Yevdokimov, a Zinoviev supporter. 

While the Central Committee and Central Control Commission were in joint session, in October 1927, debating whether to expel the leading oppositionists, including Leon Trotsky and Zinoviev, Shvernik displayed his loyalty to Stalin by throwing a book at Trotsky's head. 

In December 1927, when there were sudden food shortages in the cities because the peasants were holding back their produce in anticipation of rising prices, Shvernik was dispatched to the Urals, as regional party secretary, to oversee the confiscation of grain. He continued to support Stalin loyally through the rapid industrialisation of the soviet economy, which was opposed by almost the entire leadership of the trade unions. He was recalled to Moscow in 1929, and imposed as chairman of the Metallurgist Trade Union. From July 1930 to March 1944, he was first secretary of the All-Union Central Council of Trade Unions and a member of the Orgburo.

Shvernik presided over the 1931 Menshevik Trial, in which fourteen Russian economists came up for trial on charges of treason. In February 1937, he was a member of the commission that investigated Nikolai Bukharin and Alexei Rykov, the two most prominent former oppositionists still living the USSR, and voted that they should be expelled from the Central Committee, arrested, and shot. 

During the Second World War, Shvernik was responsible for evacuating Soviet industry away from the advancing Wehrmacht. He was Chairman of the Soviet of Nationalities from 1938 to 1946. He was Chairman of the Presidium of the Supreme Soviet of the Russian SFSR from 1944 to 1946. In 1946 he became Chairman of the Presidium of the Supreme Soviet of the USSR, succeeding Mikhail Kalinin. He only became a member of the Politburo of the CPSU Central Committee (then named the Presidium of the Party's Central Committee) in 1952 but was demoted in 1953 when the body was reduced in size.

Reputedly, Shvernik was so distressed by Stalin's death, in March 1953, that he was the only prominent party leader seen crying at the dictator's funeral. Within days, he had been demoted back to his old status as a 'candidate' member of the Praesidium, and Shvernik was removed as the Chairman of the Presidium of the Supreme Soviet and replaced by Kliment Voroshilov on 15 March 1953. He returned to his work as the chairman of the All-Union Central Council of Trade Unions. In December 1953, he was named as a member of the panel of judges who sentenced the former chief of police, Lavrentiy Beria and six others to death.

Despite his years of loyalty to Stalin, Shvernik was one of the most senior Old Bolsheviks to back Nikita Khrushchev after he had delivered the "Secret Speech" which denounced Stalin's crimes. Appointed Chairman of the Central Control Commission in 1956, he oversaw the 'rehabilitation' of scores of people wrongly convicted during the Stalin years. In July 1957, Shvernik again became a full member of the Presidium, after a stretch of more than 16 years as a 'candidate' member. He remained on the body until he retired in 1966.

Shvernik died on 24 December, 1970 at Moscow at the age 82 and his ashes were placed in an urn in the Kremlin Wall Necropolis.

References

1888 births
1970 deaths
Politicians from Saint Petersburg
People from Sankt-Peterburgsky Uyezd
Russian Social Democratic Labour Party members
Old Bolsheviks
Politburo of the Central Committee of the Communist Party of the Soviet Union members
Heads of state of the Soviet Union
Chairmen of the Soviet of Nationalities
Central Executive Committee of the Soviet Union members
First convocation members of the Soviet of Nationalities
Second convocation members of the Soviet of Nationalities
Third convocation members of the Soviet of Nationalities
Fourth convocation members of the Soviet of Nationalities
Fifth convocation members of the Soviet of Nationalities
Sixth convocation members of the Soviet of Nationalities
Heads of state of the Russian Soviet Federative Socialist Republic
All-Russian Central Executive Committee members
Members of the Supreme Soviet of the Russian Soviet Federative Socialist Republic, 1947–1951
Members of the Supreme Soviet of the Russian Soviet Federative Socialist Republic, 1951–1955
Members of the Supreme Soviet of the Russian Soviet Federative Socialist Republic, 1955–1959
Members of the Supreme Soviet of the Russian Soviet Federative Socialist Republic, 1959–1963
Members of the Supreme Soviet of the Russian Soviet Federative Socialist Republic, 1963–1967
Soviet military personnel of the Russian Civil War
Soviet people of World War II
Heroes of Socialist Labour
Recipients of the Order of Lenin
Burials at the Kremlin Wall Necropolis
Residents of the Benois House